The Midwest Collegiate Volleyball League (MCVL) is an intercollegiate men's volleyball conference associated with the NCAA's Division III.

History
The MCVL was founded in March 2014 by an amicable split of the Continental Volleyball Conference (CVC), which itself had only been created in 2011. The CVC's six Midwestern schools, which had previously formed a CVC division, wished to create a more geographically compact league. The two groups agreed that the CVC's eastern teams would retain the CVC name and branding. Since the CVC retained six members, that group also retained its automatic berth in the Division III national championship. It was also agreed that two Midwestern schools that were adding the sport for 2014–15 (2015 season) and had been announced as incoming CVC members, Benedictine University and Loras College, would instead join the new Midwestern league. The next month, the new league was unveiled as the MCVL.

In September 2014, two Illinois schools that were adding volleyball in the 2015–16 school year (2016 season), Greenville College (now Greenville University) and North Central College, were accepted as the league's 9th and 10th members. Three months later, four additional schools—Adrian College, Marian University of Wisconsin, Olivet College, and Wittenberg University—were announced as new members for 2015–16.

The MCVL was not eligible for an automatic berth in the Division III national championship in its first two seasons (2015 and 2016); during that time, its teams were eligible for at-large berths.

In January 2017, the Northern Athletics Collegiate Conference (NACC), the all-sports home of five MCVL members—charter members Benedictine, Dominican University of Illinois, Lakeland College of Wisconsin (now Lakeland University) and the Milwaukee School of Engineering (MSOE), plus 2015 arrival Marian—announced that it would begin sponsoring men's volleyball in the 2018 season. This followed previous announcements that NACC members Aurora University and Concordia University Wisconsin would launch varsity men's volleyball in that season, giving the NACC seven men's volleyball schools and an automatic berth in the Division III national championship. As a result, the MCVL initially dropped to nine members for the 2018 season. Before that season, the MCVL returned to 10 members with the addition of Augustana College of Illinois, which was set to begin sponsoring varsity men's volleyball in the 2018 season. Augustana had intended to begin varsity play as an independent with a view toward eventually gaining MCVL membership, but was immediately accepted into the league.

After the 2018 season, the MCVL lost one member and gained another. Wittenberg left to become a single-sport affiliate in the Allegheny Mountain Collegiate Conference, while Trine University resurrected a varsity program that last played in 2002 and joined the MCVL.

The MCVL lost half of its 2019 membership when the College Conference of Illinois and Wisconsin (CCIW) added men's volleyball for the 2020 season. Augustana, Carthage, Greenville, Loras, and North Central, along with new programs at North Park and Millikin, began CCIW conference play in 2020. Greenville and Loras were accepted into the CCIW as associate members.  This temporarily left the MCVL in danger of eventually losing its automatic bid to the NCAA championship, but the league restored its membership to the six needed to maintain its automatic bid by adding the University of Mount Union, which had spent its inaugural men's volleyball season of 2019 as an independent, for the 2020 season.

Three schools became members in advance of the 2021 season. Wittenberg returned to the MCVL after a two-year absence, and the league added the new varsity programs of Baldwin Wallace University and Wabash College.

Current members
The league was founded with eight members. Six joined for the 2016 season, five left after the 2017 season, and one joined for the 2018 season. The 2019 season saw the conference membership remain at 10, with one departing member replaced by a new school. After the 2019 season five teams left and Mount Union was added, dropping the league to six members for the 2020 season. The league returned to nine members for the 2021 season with the return of Wittenberg and the addition of new programs at Baldwin Wallace and Wabash. All current and former conference members are private institutions.

The conference formed Eastern and Western Divisions for the 2017 season, but reverted to a single-table format following the departure of the five NACC members.

Note that because NCAA men's volleyball is a spring sport, the year of joining is the calendar year before the first year of competition, and the year of departure for former members coincides with the final season of MCVL competition.

Former members
School names and nicknames reflect those used in the final season of MCVL membership.

Championship history

Membership timeline
As noted previously, the year of joining is the calendar year before the first season of competition.

References

NCAA Division III conferences